The Bandini 1000 is a race car, built in 1966 by Bandini Cars Forlì.

This new sports prototype, replaces the P 1000 which inherits the engine bialbero Bandini of 1000 cc engine displacement, constantly updated and improved (finally landed at rear), the scheme standstill four-wheel independent and structure of the chassis, which is only tightened with the use of new elements in the same material. With the 1000/66 the disc brakes become a constant for the following types, while entirely new for Bandini is the adoption of exchange Colotti five marches and the positioning of the twin radiator that are rear placed.

The chassis

The frame, designed and built by Ilario Bandini, is a development based on experiences gathered by the first motor car rear built.
The 1000/66 is the car with which it is metabolized and exploited change
happened with the1000 P, 1962 in this vein is considered the change in the distribution of weights and geometry of suspensions that resulted in new mergers of portamozzi.

 Structure and material: frame of elliptical section tubes, special steel aeronautics derivation; patent No. 499843
 Suspension:
 Front: Independent, triangles overlapping with shock hydraulic telescopic tilted and springs cylindrical helical coaxial; bar Account
 Rear: independent, arms swinging and triangles lower shock hydraulic telescopic inclined agents on portamozzi and springs cylindrical helical coaxial, camber caster and Toe adjustable bar Account

 Braking system:
 Service: hydraulic disc front and rear Amadori
 Steering: a rack and pinion
 Guide: left
 Wheels: Borrani Ray and Light Amadori
 Tank: 
 Transmission: differential and return rear Colotti
 Weight total:

Engine Bandini Bialbero 1000

 Positioning: longitudinal rear, 4-cylinder in-line
 Materials and specifics: a mixed distribution: chain gears, on casters double camshaft Head alloy aluminium, 8 valves, chamber burst hemisphere, block and base to five media bench unique fusion of aluminium, sump in aluminium, reeds of cylinders in iron chrome and detachable
 Bore: 
 Stroke: 
 Displacement: 987 cc
 Compression ratio: 9,5:1
 Power: 2 Weber carburetors double body 38DCO3
 Power: 105 CV @ 8500 rpm
 Lubricate: Carter with wet gear pump and filter external
 Cooling: forced liquid with centrifugal pump-driven belt and pulley, 2 aluminum radiators to rear
 Gearbox and clutch: 5 speed + RG clutch dry disc
 Ignition and electrical equipment: coil and distributor on the head, battery 12 V and generator

The body

The two-seater sports car (little boat) is implemented fully by Bandini in aluminium. Extremely low, especially to the goalkeeper, is softly lies on the chassis highlighting the wheels; ray Borrani initially and later in Light Amadori. The air-intake front, close and rounded side is purely aesthetic and are functional the four big air behind the rear wheel that open just behind the cockpit well protected by screens in Plexiglas.
The rear, is interrupted by a sharp vertical cut that originates a large oval opening to whose ends are the round headlights rear. More small openings tilted, the same form of that great earlier, highlight the shape of the rear wheel giving consistency to the whole body.
Over the years, has been amended several times the roll-bar in the most recent version is hidden by a long fin and rounded longitudinal with the addition of head-rests.
The original white livery and red was replaced at the end of the year 1971 with the current red and blue.
Today is exposed to the museum town Forlì.

See also
 Ilario Bandini
 Bandini Cars

Bandini vehicles
Sports racing cars
1960s cars
Cars introduced in 1966